The Naples Metro is the rapid transit system serving the city of Naples, Italy. The system comprises three underground rapid transit lines (Line 1, Line 6 and the Naples-Aversa Metro).

History 
In 1911, construction on the urban section of the Rome–Formia–Naples railway, the Villa Literno–Napoli Gianturco railway was commenced, and although it was suspended for the duration of World War I, the line was eventually opened on 28 September 1925 as an urban railway service line, the first in Italy. This service is now known as Line 2.

After World War II, the existing Circumvesuviana railway was upgraded to a modern commuter rail, and also the Cumana railway became relevant for the commuter transport. In 1962, the Circumflegrea railway was opened.

Construction of the first underground metro railway (Line 1) began in 1976, and the first part opened on 28 March 1993.

Although progress had been made from the early setbacks and problems, it was still apparent by 1997 that the network suffered badly from the lack of network integration and poor connections, as well as the fact that large areas of Naples were not close to stations. In 1997, the city government drew up a new Piano Comunale dei Trasporti di Napoli (City Transport Plan) which called for a review of the network, improved controls over maintenance expenditure and general finances, a new tariff control system and better management of the urban rail network of Naples.

The transport plan called for a three phase major redevelopment. Phase 2 was designed to increase the network to 7 lines, with 84 stations, and 16 interchange nodes, plus 10 bus interchanges, to be completed by 2007. The plan called for 70% of Neapolitans to be living within 500 metres of a transport access point by 2011.

In conjunction with the regional government of Campania, the comune government of Naples incorporated a new fully state-controlled joint-stock corporation called Metronapoli, which was 99% controlled by the comune and 1% controlled by ANM (Azienda Napoletana Mobilità), with a mission statement of: "providing an  efficient public rail transport service of quality to the city".

In 2000, a new line, Line 9, was proposed. Intended to connect the National Archaeological Museum via the Museo di Capodimonte, providing an alternative route to part of Line 1, the project was abandoned.

Metronapoli took over responsibility for running the urban rail transport network of Naples as part of a planned massive re-invigoration of public transport in the Campania region, on 1 February 2001.

On 14 April 2001, service on Line 1 was extended from Vanvitelli to Museum (Museo) station.

In 2005, The Naples-Aversa Metro line opened between Piscinola and Mugnano.

On 3 December 2005, the CIPE (Interdepartmental Committee for Economic Planning) announced over €600 million worth of funding to be spent the Metropolitana di Napoli network. €323 million was allocated for Montesanto station (Cumana and Circumflegrea), €61.1 million for Quattro Giornate station (Line 1 and Circumflegrea), with both projects to be completed by 2010, as well as €119.7 million to be spent to improve the section of Line 1 between Capodichino and Centro Direzionale and €100 million for the San Pasquale–Municipio section.

From 23 December 2006 to 20 February 2007, a special exhibition of models and multimedia presentations was held at Castel dell'Ovo to showcase all of the planned improvements to the Metropolitana di Napoli network, and was extremely well received by Neapolitans.

In 2009, the Naples-Aversa Metro extended to Aversa Centro.

On 28 March 2011, Line 1 was extended from Museo station to Università.

On 17 September 2012, the Toledo station between Dante and Università opened on Line 1.

On 31 December 2013, Line 1 was extended to Garibaldi right next to the central train station.

On 2 June 2015, the station Municipio (Town Hall) was opened between Università and Toledo on Line 1.

In August 2021, Duomo Station began operating, its steel and glass dome delayed by subterranean archeological discoveries and related funding and construction pressures.

Operator
Azienda Napoletana Mobilità SpA is currently responsible for the transport services and maintenance of Line 1, Line 6, pedestrian subways, and the funicular railways (Chiaia, Mergellina and Montesanto).

Network

The Naples Metro currently operates on three lines.

Future expansion

Extension work is underway on Line 1 between Garibaldi and Capodichino (Naples International Airport).

Line 6 has been closed since 2013 in order for the extension work to take place. The current plan is to open the 4-station extension in December 2021.

In July 2020, a new , 13 station metro line was announced; Line 10, linking Naples city centre to the Napoli Afragola railway station (which opened in 2017) via the adjacent city of Afragola. Construction on this line could begin as soon as 2021, and is expected to generate 150,000 daily passengers, or 43 million annually.

Rolling stock
 Line 1: Firema Metronapoli M1
 Line 6: T67
 Naples-Aversa Metro: Breda M100

Travelling

Fares

UNICO NAPOLI is the integrated fare that allows  to travel on all means of transport of Consortium companies in Naples.
There are different kinds of tickets and passes: hourly, daily or weekend daily ticket, monthly or annual pass.
The hourly ticket is Valid for 90 minutes from the first validation, while the daily ticket is valid from 00.00 to midnight of the day of validation.
The owner must fill in the appropriate blanks with their name and date of birth, and must show an ID when requested.

Operations
Trains operate from 6:00 to 23:00 every day of the year. Headways on Line 1 are generally between 10–14 minutes, but reach a maximum of 8 minutes during weekday peak hours.

, line 6 is closed to the public.

Artwork

Line 1 has been renamed 'Il Metrò dell'Arte' (The Art Metro) reflecting the fact that eight stations have been upgraded to exhibit works of art. These include both permanent exhibits and the provision for temporary displays. It is intended that this theme will continue as more of the planned stations on Line 1 are opened.

Museum station (stazione Museo) also displays archaeological remains and exhibits that were unearthed during the construction of the station, while others have been transferred to the Museo Archeologico Nazionale di Napoli (Naples National Archaeological Museum) above the station, from which it is named.

Another initiative recently started on the Metropolitana di Napoli was to provide free books for riders on the network.

See also
 List of Naples Metro stations
 Line 2 (Naples) (commuter rail line)
 Circumvesuviana
 Circumflegrea railway
 Cumana railway
 Naples–Aversa railway
 Trams in Naples
 List of metro systems
 Lists of rapid transit systems

References

External links

 ANM – official website 

 
1993 establishments in Italy
Railway lines opened in 1993